Godwin Aguda Wanbe (born December 30, 1997) is a Nigerian professional footballer who was recently signed to play as a forward, for Falkenbergs FF in the Swedish Superettan division following his stellar performance with Rivers United in the league and CAF Confederations Cup playoff.

Career 
Aguda is the current topscorer of the 2018-19 CAF Confederation Cup with six goals.

Honours 
 Nigeria Federation Cup
 Winner : 2018
 Nigeria Professional Football League
 Winner : 2016

References 

Living people
1997 births
Nigerian footballers
Nigerian expatriate footballers
Rangers International F.C. players
Al-Washm Club players
Nigeria Professional Football League players
Saudi Second Division players
Expatriate footballers in Saudi Arabia
Nigerian expatriate sportspeople in Saudi Arabia
Association football forwards